Judith Miller (3 July 1941 – 6 December 2017) was a French psychoanalyst, born in Antibes. She was the daughter of the psychoanalyst Jacques Lacan and Sylvia Bataille. Her spouse was Lacanian Jacques-Alain Miller.

Work
As a Maoist philosophy lecturer at Vincennes in Paris, Miller's radicalism was used as a reason for her philosophy department to be decertified. This occurred after she handed out course credit to someone she met on a bus, and subsequently publicly declared in a radio interview that the university is a capitalist institution, and that she would do everything she could to make it run as badly as possible. After this, she was demoted by the French education department to a lycée teacher.

Death
Judith Miller died on 6 December 2017 in Paris, aged 76.

Works
 "Métaphysique de la physique de Galilée", Cahiers pour l’Analyse 9.9 (1968)
 Le Champ freudien à travers le monde: textes recueillis, Paris: Seuil, 1986.
 Album Jacques Lacan: visages de mon père, Paris: Seuil, 1990
 (with Hervé Castanet) Pierre Klossowski, la pantomime des esprits : suivi d'un entretien de Pierre Klossowski avec Judith Miller, Nantes: C. Defaut, 2007

References

Psychologues freudiens Entretien avec Judith Miller sur le "Champ freudien".

External links
 
 

1941 births
2017 deaths
People from Antibes
French Jews
French Maoists
French people of Romanian-Jewish descent
French philosophers
French psychoanalysts
Jewish philosophers
Jewish socialists
Maoist theorists